Indo American College of Nursing is located in Moga, Punjab (India) and established in 1997 by Dr. Harbir Singh Sandhu. The institute is ISO 9001:2008 certified by American Board of Accreditation Services.  Indo American College of Nursing recognized by Indian Nursing Council (I.N.C.) New Delhi, Punjab Nurses Registration Council Chandigarh, Punjab Govt. and affiliated to Baba Farid University of Health Sciences Faridkot.

Campus
Indo American College campus is on the Amritsar-Jalandhar High-Way in Moga.

Courses

B.Sc. Nursing(Basic)
 Four years Degree Course for 10+2(medical) graduate students

B.Sc. Nursing(Post Basic)
 Two years Degree Course after completion of G.N.M course

G.N.M.
 Three years Diploma Course for 10+2 graduate students

A.N.M.
 Two years Diploma Course

External links
 

Universities and colleges in Punjab, India
Moga, Punjab
Nursing schools in India